Star Trek: Bridge Crew is a virtual-reality action-adventure video game developed by Red Storm Entertainment and published by Ubisoft for Microsoft Windows, PlayStation 4, and Oculus Quest.

Plot
Star Trek: Bridge Crew takes place in the timeline established in the 2009 Star Trek film and sees the Starfleet ship USS Aegis searching for a new homeworld for the Vulcans after the destruction of their planet. The ship heads for a region of space called 'The Trench', which is being occupied by Klingons.

Gameplay
The game is played through four roles: captain, tactical officer, engineer and helm officer. The captain is the only role to which mission objectives are directly displayed; they are responsible for communicating these to the crew and issuing orders to accomplish them. The helm officer controls the ship's course and travel between regions through impulse or warp drive. The tactical officer is in charge of sensors and weapons. The engineer manages the ship's power distribution and supervises repairs. Each role except the captain may be occupied by a human player or by an NPC indirectly controlled by the captain. Both story and randomly generated missions exist.

In December 2017, the game developers modified the game so that it can be played without a virtual-reality headset. Prior to that, the game could only be played using a headset.

Development
It was developed by Red Storm Entertainment and published by Ubisoft. Series actors Karl Urban, LeVar Burton and Jeri Ryan appeared at E3 2016 to promote the game during Ubisoft's press conference. A new trailer was showcased at CES 2017. The game was released on May 30, 2017.

Reception

Star Trek: Bridge Crew received "generally positive" reviews, according to review aggregator Metacritic. Eurogamer ranked it 42nd on their list of the "Top 50 Games of 2017", while GamesRadar+ ranked it 25th on their list of the 25 Best Games of 2017.

Many reviews compared it to Artemis: Spaceship Bridge Simulator, an indie game inspired by Star Trek, stating that Star Trek: Bridge Crew is basically "Artemis in the Star Trek universe".

In 2017, PC Gamer ranked Star Trek: Bridge Crew among the best Star Trek games.

Accolades

See also
 List of Star Trek games

References

2017 video games
Action-adventure games
Multiplayer and single-player video games
Multiplayer vehicle operation games
PlayStation 4 games
PlayStation VR games
Red Storm Entertainment games
Science fiction video games
Space MOGs
Bridge Crew
Ubisoft games
Valve Index games
Video games based on Star Trek (film franchise)
Video games developed in the United States
Video games with cross-platform play
Virtual reality games
Windows games